Americares is a global non-profit organization focused on health and development that responds to individuals affected by poverty, disaster, or crisis. The organization addresses poverty, disasters, or crises with medicine, medical supplies and health programs. 

Since it was established in 1979, Americares has delivered more than $17 billion in humanitarian aid to 164 countries to address issues like natural disasters, the restoration of a community after natural disasters, and ongoing health crises and inequality.

Americares has their global headquarters in Stamford, Connecticut. In addition, the organization has offices in Colombia, El Salvador, Haiti, India, Liberia, Nepal, the Philippines, Tanzania, Puerto Rico, and elsewhere in the United States.  Americares operates three warehouses, one each in the U.S., Europe, and India.

History 
On April 4, 1975, a U.S. jet, while taking off from Saigon, crashed into a jungle outside of Tan Son Nhut. The jet carried 242 Vietnamese orphans bound for adoption in the U.S. The accident caused the death of a third of the children, and those who survived were critically injured and were waiting to be rescued. The Pentagon announced that it could not get assistance and resources to the crash site for at least 11 days.

Robert Macauley, who was an executive in the paper industry (Virginia Fibre Corporation), arranged to have a Pan American Airlines 747 rescue the children. The children were rescued and flown to San Francisco within 48 hours. The jet cost $251,000. Macauley mortgaged his house to cover the expense. Macauley was educated at Greenwich Country Day School, Andover Phillips Academy, and Yale University, where he studied international affairs. He has a large desire to help people who are in need. 

In 1981, Pope John Paul II asked Macauley to raise funds that would provide medicine, clothing and other supplies for people suffering under martial law in Poland. In March 1982, the first airlift delivered $2.4 million worth of medicine and supplies to Poland. This marked the first official mission of the organization.

Macauley served as the CEO of Americares from 1979 to 2002, and chairman of the board until his death caused by emphysema in 2010. He originally founded Americares in New Canaan, Connecticut in 1979. It was then relocated to its current headquarters location in Stamford, Connecticut. During 1993, Americares was rated "the Best Charity in America" by Money. The organization has always been rooted in strong partnerships, effective fundraising, and the dedication of volunteers.

Current leadership
Michael J. Nyenhuis has served as CEO of Americares from 2014 until March 14, 2020. His salary is reported at approximately $500,000.

Americares recently announced that former executive vice president and chief development officer Christine Squires has superseded Nyenhuis as CEO of the Americares Foundation. As the new CEO of Americares, Squires will have the responsibility of overseeing all of Americares' global operations. Nyenhuis is reported to have become CEO of UNICEF USA.

Prior to joining Americares in 2016, Squires served as a chief operating officer for Physicians for Human Rights, where she oversaw the organization's global development and strategic planning efforts. Squires also headed up growth and fundraising for Human Rights Watch and spent 10 years at the United States Fund for UNICEF. She holds a bachelor's degree in English from the University of Delaware and is a graduate of the Center for Creative Leadership's Executive Development Program.
Jerry Leamon has served as the chairman of the board of Americares Foundation. Leamon joined the Americares board in 2005 and was elected chairman in 2015. He retired from the Deloitte network in 2012 as global managing director responsible for client and market-facing programs.

Emergency response 
Americares organizes emergency response teams to deliver urgently needed aid to survivors of disasters. Such aid includes medicines, medical supplies, water or water purification treatments, and other critically needed resources. In 2012, Americares responded to 24 emergencies in 18 countries.

Following Hurricane Sandy in 2012, Americares delivered emergency supplies for more than 400,000 people in Connecticut, New Jersey, and New York, including blankets, flashlights, bottled water, and first aid kits. Americares continued to provide post-emergency relief with the Americares mobile medical clinic used to assist health care facilities unable to treat patients because of storm damage and power outages.

Americares sent $6 million in medical aid immediately after the 2010 Haiti earthquake.  Among prominent donors, actress Jennifer Aniston supported the organization's work in Haiti with a benefit screening.  Since then, the organization has given the country more than $60 million in aid for vaccinations, maternal health, cholera prevention and health workers training.

In response to the earthquake and tsunami in Japan in 2011, Americares sent close to $6 million in medical supplies and humanitarian aid. The recovery work in Japan included restoring medical and dental clinics and psychosocial programs for survivors. Since then most of these programs have found to be successful. The medical and dental clinics are all back and in good standing form. On top of that many survivors did reach out for psychological assistance and have been treated. 

In 2020 there was a quick and needed response from Americares due to the coronavirus. The COVID-19 pandemic is a pandemic of coronavirus disease 2019 (COVID-19) caused by the severe acute respiratory syndrome coronavirus 2 (SARS-CoV-2). The disease was first identified in Wuhan, Hubei, China in December 2019. Americares has a long history of responding to infectious disease outbreaks, including cholera, ebola, dengue, and Zika outbreaks. Americares is delivering more than 1.4 million protective masks for health workers on the front lines of the COVID-19 pandemic in the United States. The masks will help to alleviate shortages at hospitals and primary care facilities in 11 states and Puerto Rico. This ongoing effort, along with monetary funds, is being contributed in relief of this pandemic. 

Other major disasters that Americares has responded to include:

 1988 Armenian earthquake  
 2004 Indian Ocean earthquake and tsunami  
 Myanmar's Cyclone Nargis (2008) 
 China earthquake (2008) 
 2010 Haiti earthquake (2010) 
 Japan earthquake and tsunami (2011) 
 Joplin tornado (2011) 
 Somalia famine (2011) 
 Hurricane Matthew (2016)
 Hurricane Harvey (2017)
 Hurricane Irma (2017)
 Hurricane Dorian (2019)
 COVID-19 pandemic
 Russo-Ukrainian War

Budget, contributions, fundraising approaches, donations
According to Americare's 2017 IRS 990 information provided by ProPublica, the Americares Foundation was reported to have reached a total revenue of 2.79 billion dollars in contributions for the fiscal year-end of 2017. In the 2017 report, Americares’ total functional expenses were reported at 1.92 billion dollars; with the majority of it being charitable services. For that year, professional fundraising fees were recorded at 1.13 million dollars. 

According to 2019 data collected by Forbes, Americares was number 10 on the list of the top 100 largest charities in the United States. In that same 2019 report, Forbes also recorded that Americares reached a total revenue of 1 billion dollars in private donations; with a 127% donor dependency rate. For that year also, Americares was reported to earn $318 million in net assets. Forbes rated Americares a score of 99% in charitable commitment for the year 2019; with Americares reported to have spent 1.3 billion dollars on charitable services expenses, 5 million dollars on management and general expenses and 11 million dollars in fundraising. The highest amount of compensation to an individual employee for 2021 was $506,885.

Global medical assistance

Assistance and aid 
Globally, Americares delivers free medical aid including prescription and over-the-counter medicines, nutritional supplements, surgical and wound care supplies, hospital supplies and diagnostics and laboratory equipment with the support of corporate and financial donors.

The nonprofit sends aid to institutions through partner organizations located in the United States and countries around the world. The institutions include thousands of general and specialty hospitals, outpatient clinics, community health programs, hospice residences, rehabilitation centers and homes for children and the elderly.

Americares also works to create or improve existing health care programs that target specific health issues, including maternal health, child health, malnutrition, cholera and chronic diseases.

Americares in the United States 
Americares supplies medicine and medical supplies to more than 400 free and charitable health care clinics across the U.S.  Americares provides emergency relief as well as vaccinations to low income Americans. The nonprofit also responds to disasters (hurricanes, tornadoes, floods, wildfires, etc.) in the U.S. by sending medicine and emergency relief supplies including bottled water, hygiene kits and household cleaning kits.

Medical Outreach Program 
Americares Medical Outreach Program donates medical products to U.S.-based health care professionals bringing medical care to disadvantaged or isolated areas around the world. The services offered by these field volunteers range from primary care to specialty surgeries.  Each year Americares supports over 1,000 medical outreach trips in approximately 80 countries, with primary medications, anesthesia, surgical supplies, nutritional supplements, and over-the-counter products. Volunteer teams treat over 700,000 primary care patients and perform 40,000 surgeries a year.

Americares India 
In 2006, Americares India Foundation was registered as a public charitable trust in India.  Prof. (Dr.) Purvish M. Parikh, a distinguished oncologist, was named the new managing director of AmeriCares India. This new division gave Americares a new platform to deliver more medicines and emergency supplies to facilities serving the poor in India.  The Americares India mobile medical clinics provide medical consultations and medicines to those living in the Mumbai slums. The organization also raises awareness about disease prevention, supports health promotion programs, and educates children on the importance of proper hygiene techniques.

Americares free clinics 
Americares free clinics have provided primary health care to the uninsured since 1994. The free clinics provide medical services to thousands of people every year by utilizing a network of volunteer doctors, nurses, interpreters and administrative personnel. Americares personnel also work closely with local hospitals, labs and specialists who donate their services.

The four Americares free clinics are:
 Bob Macauley Americares Free Clinic of Norwalk (established 1994)
 Boehringer Ingelheim Americares Free Clinic of Danbury (established 1997)
 Weisman Americares Free Clinic of Bridgeport (established 2003)
 Stamford Americares Free Clinic (established 2014)

Fiscal responsibility 
Americares consistently received high ratings from the Better Business Bureau and Charity Navigator for efficiency and a commitment to fiscal responsibility.  These ratings reflect the fact that more than 97% of total expenses directly support programs and relief for people in need, and 3% represent administrative costs.

Americares Airlift Benefit 
Americares has hosted an annual Airlift Benefit, also known as the Hangar Party, since 1988. The event takes place at the Westchester County Airport in White Plains, New York. At the end of the evening, donors board a chartered plane to see Americares work firsthand.  Destinations have included the Dominican Republic, El Salvador, Guatemala, Haiti, Honduras, Mexico and Nicaragua.

In recent years, the Airlift Benefit has had prominent hosts: Anderson Cooper in 2007, Ann Curry in 2008, Mika Brzezinski in 2009 and 2011 and Kelly Wallace in 2010. The Airlift Benefit has also drawn special guests including actor Aaron Eckhart and baseball manager Bobby Valentine.

References

External links
 
 Americares India
 Americare Clinic Vietnam

Emergency organizations
International charities
Health charities in the United States
Charities based in Connecticut
Companies based in Stamford, Connecticut
Organizations based in Stamford, Connecticut
Medical and health organizations based in Connecticut
Organizations established in 1979
1979 establishments in Connecticut